Psalm 105 is the 105th psalm of the biblical Book of Psalms. In the slightly different numbering system used in the Greek Septuagint and Latin Vulgate translations of the Bible, this psalm is Psalm 104. Alexander Kirkpatrick observes that Psalms 105 and 106, the two historical psalms which end Book 4 of the Hebrew psalms, are closely related. Psalm 105 gives thanks for God's faithfulness to the covenant he made with Abraham; Psalm 106 is a psalm of penitence, reciting the history of Israel’s faithlessness and disobedience.

Parallel with 1 Chronicles 16
There are two slight differences between the wording of verses 1-15 and the parallel passage in 1 Chronicles 16:
Verse 6: O offspring of his servant Abraham, reads O offspring of his servant Israel in 1 Chronicles 16:13
Verse 8: He is mindful of his covenant for ever reads Remember his covenant for ever in 1 Chronicles 16:15.

Verse 1
Oh, give thanks to the Lord!Call upon His name;
Make known His deeds among the peoples!
The word "Ἁλληλουιά", "alleluia", precedes this verse in the Septuagint, where it has been transposed from verse 35 of the previous psalm.

Uses

Judaism
Recited on the first day of Passover.
Verses 8-10 are part of the paragraph recited in the naming of a boy at a brit milah.
Verses 8 and 42 are found separately in the repetition of the Amidah on Rosh Hashanah.

Psalm 105 is one of the ten Psalms of the Tikkun HaKlali of Rebbe Nachman of Breslov.

New Testament
Verses 8-9 are quoted in Luke .

See also
 The Exodus
 Ipuwer Papyrus
 Passover
 Plagues of Egypt
 Sources and parallels of the Exodus
 Stations of the Exodus
 Related Bible passages: Va'eira, Bo (parsha), and Beshalach: Torah portions (parashot) telling the Exodus story; Psalm 78

References

External links

 in Hebrew and English - Mechon-mamre
 King James Bible - Wikisource

105